Averno may refer to:

Lake Avernus, a crater lake in south Italy
Avernus, entrance to the Roman underworld
Averno (poetry collection), a book of poetry by Louise Glück
Averno (wrestler), Mexican professional wrestler
Averno (universe), multimedia universe/franchise created by Morgan Smith